The Black Fleet Crisis is a trilogy set in the Star Wars expanded universe. The books take place 16 years after Star Wars Episode IV: A New Hope. All three novels were authored by Michael P. Kube-McDowell and published by Bantam Books under the imprint Bantam Spectra between March 1996 and November 1998.

Books
 Before the Storm, published March 1, 1996
 Shield of Lies, published August 1, 1996
 Tyrant's Test, published December 1, 1996

Plot
The Black Fleet Crisis begins in a time of peace for the New Republic, and the first time a chance occurs for the Rebel Alliance to turn their attention to more personal concerns.

The outbreak of the Black Fleet Crisis ends a period of relative peace in the galaxy. Yevethan forces (former Imperial slaves who overthrew their masters) using captured Imperial ships begin a genocidal campaign to conquer the Koornacht Cluster by killing all non-Yevethans. The New Republic is forced to fight in its own defense, as well as to rescue hostages held by the Yevethans (including Han Solo). After obtaining an image of Han as a battered hostage, Chewbacca goes on a desperate rescue mission.

Luke Skywalker travels with Akanah Norand Goss Pell to seek out what he's told are mother's people, the Fallanassi, to learn about them. Luke finds that the Fallanassi are a mysterious and secretive sect of Force users who are total pacifists. Luke learns new Force techniques and philosophies from them, and gains their help to aid the New Republic in one battle.

Leia is the only person who doesn't have a chance to rest, who because of her fame,  what others expect of her, and her sense of duty and obligation, she has become a prisoner of the Presidency. But she is far too tired, stressed beyond her limits, and emotionally fragile, and she is only two steps away from a serious personal crisis of her confidence. Nil Spaar, the Machiavellian Viceroy of the Yevethan Protectorate, sees that as an opportunity he can exploit and an opportunity to destroy the New Republic from within.

See also
 List of Star Wars Books

References

External links
 The Black Fleet Crisis FAQ

Book series introduced in 1996
Star Wars Legends novels
 
Bantam Spectra books